This is a list of Danish television related events from 1968.

Events

Debuts

Television shows

Ending this year

Births
16 May - Sidsel Agensø, actress & TV host
1 July - Gry de la Cour, TV host

Deaths